Diastictis fracturalis, the fractured western snout moth, is a moth in the family Crambidae. It was described by Zeller in 1872. It is found in North America, where it has been recorded from California to South Dakota, Colorado and Louisiana. It is also found in Mexico (Sonora, Guerrero, Jalisco).

References

Moths described in 1872
Spilomelinae